Piano–Rag–Music is a ballet made by New York City Ballet balletmaster in chief Peter Martins to Stravinsky's eponymous music from 1919. The premiere took place on June 10, 1982, as part of City Ballets's Stravinsky Centennial Celebration at the New York State Theater, Lincoln Center.

Original cast 
 
Darci Kistler
Cornel Crabtree
Afshin Mofid 
Peter Schetter
Ulrik Trojaborg

Reviews 
NY Times article by John Corry, June 6, 1982
NY Times review by Anna Kisselgoff, June 12, 1982

Ballets by Peter Martins
New York City Ballet repertory
Ballets to the music of Igor Stravinsky
1982 ballet premieres
New York City Ballet Stravinsky Centennial Celebration